Tobias Barreto is a municipality located in the Brazilian state of Sergipe. Its population is 52,530 (2020) and its area is 1,033 km².

It was formerly known as Vila de Campos do Rio Real, but was rechristened Tobias Barreto in order to honor the homonymous poet who was born in there.

References

Municipalities in Sergipe